Hilotongan is a small island barangay to the west of Bantayan Island in the Philippines.

References

Barangays of Cebu